Orthotylus junipericola is a species of bug from the Miridae family that can be found on Azores, and in countries like Bulgaria, France, Greece, Spain, and Dodecanese Islands.

References

Insects described in 1965
Hemiptera of Europe
junipericola